Stara Błotnica  is a village in Białobrzegi County, Masovian Voivodeship, in east-central Poland. It is the seat of the gmina (administrative district) called Stara Błotnica.

References

Villages in Białobrzegi County